Zhang Kailin was the defending champion, but chose not to participate.

Chang Kai-chen won the title, defeating Wang Yafan in the final, 4–6, 6–2, 6–1.

Seeds

Main draw

Finals

Top half

Bottom half

References 
 Main draw

Suzhou Ladies Open - Singles